This is a list of notable events relating to the environment in 1970. They relate to environmental law, conservation, environmentalism and environmental issues.

Events
The California Environmental Quality Act is passed into law.

January 
The United States National Environmental Policy Act becomes effective.

February 
US President Richard Nixon gave the nation’s first presidential message on the environment.

April 
The first Earth Day took place. Twenty million people participated in teach-ins in the United States.
US President Richard Nixon signed the Environmental Quality Improvement Act.

December 
The United States Environmental Protection Agency is formed.
President Richard Nixon signed the signed the Clean Air Act of 1970.

See also

Human impact on the environment
List of environmental issues

References